Microchrysa congoensis is a species of soldier fly in the family Stratiomyidae.

Distribution
Tanzania, Congo

References

Stratiomyidae
Insects described in 1938
Taxa named by Erwin Lindner
Diptera of Africa